The Deer Terrace Pavilion was a structure believed to have been built during the Shang dynasty. Its location was believed to be in Zhaoge (near the present-day Jinniuling mountain ridge in Qi County, Hebi).

It was also the site of a very luxurious pool, named the "Lake of Wine and Forest of Meat", where meat would be hung alongside the pool, and the pool would be filled with wine all for the personal pleasure of King Zhou of Shang. The phrase  (Jiǔchí Ròulín) is now a Chinese idiom for excessive extravagance and debauchery.

In 1999, the pool was uncovered in an archaeological survey. The archaeologists concluded that contrary to the theory that the pool's real purpose was to provide groundwater for the pavilion, the existence of contemporary water wells close to the pool proves that the primary function of the pool was not to supply water.

On 20 January 1046 BC, King Wu of Zhou launched a violent attack on the Shang capital, Zhaoge, as part of the Battle of Muye. Zhou quickly defeated Shang, and the last king of Shang, King Zhou, retreated to the pavilion and set it on fire, burning it and himself along with his jewels as the result of the defeat. This event marked the end of the Shang dynasty and the beginning of the Zhou dynasty. The charred remains of the pavilion have yet to be identified.

References

Shang dynasty
11th century BC in China